Sebiș Solar Park is a large thin-film photovoltaic (PV) power system, built on a  plot of land located in Sebiș, Arad County, in western Romania. 

The solar park has around 317,000 state-of-the-art thin film PV panels for a total nameplate capacity of 65-megawatts, and was completed in December 2013. The solar park was expected to supply around 91 GWh of electricity per year, enough to power some 100,000 average homes.

The investment cost for the Sebiș solar park amounted to some €100 million.

See also

Energy policy of the European Union
Photovoltaics
Renewable energy commercialization
Renewable energy in the European Union
Solar power in Romania

References

Photovoltaic power stations in Romania